Zeleny Gai is an impact crater in Ukraine (Kirovohrad Oblast).

It is 3.5 km (2.2 mi) in diameter and the age is estimated to be 80 ± 20 million years (Upper Cretaceous). The crater is not exposed at the surface.

References 

Impact craters of Ukraine
Cretaceous impact craters
Geography of Kirovohrad Oblast